Chaupai is a village in Asoha block of Unnao district, Uttar Pradesh, India. It has one primary school and no healthcare facilities. As of 2011, its population is 2,548, in 554 households.

The 1961 census recorded Chaupai as comprising 3 hamlets, with a total population of 1,201 (627 male and 574 female), in 249 households and 237 physical houses. The area of the village was given as 1,342 acres. It had a medical practitioner and a post office at the time.

References

Villages in Unnao district